Vargeh Pahneh (also Romanized as Vārgeh Pahneh; also known as Vārkah-e Pahneh) is a village in Pishkuh-e Mugui Rural District, in the Central District of Fereydunshahr County, Isfahan Province, Iran. At the 2006 census, its population was 7, in 4 families.

References 

Populated places in Fereydunshahr County